Membrane sex steroid receptor may refer to:

 Membrane androgen receptor
 Membrane estrogen receptor
 Membrane progesterone receptor